Maravankudieruppu  is a Nadar village in the jurisdiction of Nagercoil Corporation, located in the state of Tamil Nadu in India.

References
 Maravankudieruppu home page
Nadar Sangam Page
Police Station
Co-operative Banks
Controversy

External links
 Maravankudieruppu Portal
 Category:Maravankudieruppu, India at The Work of God's Children wiki

Kanyakumari
Villages in Kanyakumari district